Shayne is an English language masculine given name variant of the Irish given name Shane: variant of Sean, linguistically derived from the Hebrew given name John. Shayne is also an occasional surname. 
People with the name Shayne include:

Given name

 M. Shayne Bell (born 1957), American author
 Shayne Bennett (born 1972), Canadian baseball pitcher
 Shayne Bower aka Biff Wellington (died 2007), Canadian professional wrestler
 Shayne Bradley (born 1979), English footballer
 Shayne Breuer (born 1972), Australian rules footballer
 Shayne Burgess (born 1964), English darts player
 Shayne Carter (born ca.1963), New Zealand musician
 Shayne Corson (born 1966), Canadian hockey forward
 Shayne Culpepper (born 1973), American middle distance runner
 Shayne Elliott (born 1963/64), New Zealand banker
 Shayne Gostisbehere (born 1993), American hockey defenseman
 Shayne Graham (born 1977), American football placekicker
 Shayne Mallard (born c. 1964), Australian politician
 Shayne McCosh (born 1974),Canadian ice hockey defenceman
 Shayne Murphy (born 1952), Australian politician
 Shayne Neumann (born 1961), Australian politician
 Shayne O'Connor (born 1973), New Zealand cricketer
 Shayne Pattynama (born 1998), Dutch footballer
 Shayne Stevenson (born 1970), Canadian ice hockey centre
 Shayne-Feygl Szapiro (Szejne Fejgl Szapiro-Michalewicz, Dina Blond, 1887-1985), member of the Jewish Labour Bund in Poland and a prolific Yiddish translator
 Shayne Toporowski (born 1975), Canadian ice hockey right winger
 Shayne Topp (born 1991), American actor and comedian, known for being a member of the Smosh Squad
 Shayne Ward (born 1984), English pop singer and actor
 Shayne Watson (born 1982), Australian professional baseball player, coach

Fictional
 Shayne Lewis, a character on the American CBS daytime soap opera Guiding Light

Surname

 Konstantin Shayne (1888–1974), Russian-American actor
 Maggie Shayne, American author
 Robert Shayne (1900–1992), American actor

Fictional
 Michael Shayne, a private detective character in books written by Brett Halliday
 Reva Shayne, a character on the American daytime soap opera Guiding Light

References

See also
 Sean
 Shane (name)
 John (given name)

English masculine given names